Edmonton/Cooking Lake Water Aerodrome  is located  east southeast of Edmonton, Alberta, Canada. The aerodrome is located on Cooking Lake.

See also
List of airports in the Edmonton Metropolitan Region

References

Registered aerodromes in Alberta
Edmonton Airports
Transport in Strathcona County
Seaplane bases in Alberta